Ross Lovegrove (born 1958 in Cardiff, Wales) is a Welsh artist and industrial designer.

Biography 
Ross Lovegrove was born in Wales in 1958. He studied at Manchester Polytechnic (now Manchester Metropolitan University), graduating with a First Class BA in Industrial Design in 1980. In 1983, he graduated from the Royal College of Art with a Master of Design.

In the early 1980s he worked with Hartmut Esslinger as a designer for frog design on projects such as Walkmans for Sony, and Computers for Apple Computers; he later moved to Paris to work for Knoll International, and also collaborated with Jean Nouvel and Phillipe Stark. in the late 1980s, he returned to London, and in 1990 he founded a practice of his own, Studio X.

In 2007 he designed a limited edition speaker system called Muon for the British audio company KEF.

In April 2017 a major retrospective of his work entitled CONVERGENCE was exhibited at the Pompidou Centre in Paris in the context of the museum's fortieth anniversary. His work has been exhibited internationally, and is held in the permanent collection of institutions including the Museum of Modern Art (MoMA) in New York, the Vitra Design Museum, and the Design Museum in London.

Personal life 
Ross Lovegrove was raised in Penarth by parents who were first cousins and who both hold the name Lovegrove.

Awards 
 Curated the first permanent collection. The same year, he was awarded the Red dot design award for the products created for VitrA

Exhibitions 

 Solo show at Philips de Pury & Company, New York, March 2017
Solo show at Centre Pompidou, Paris, France, April 12 – July 3, 2017

References

External links 
 
 Ross Lovegrove, Museum of Modern Art (MoMA) holdings
 Ross Lovegrove, Pompidou Centre holdings
 Ross Lovegrove, Vitra Design Museum holdings

1958 births
Living people
Welsh industrial designers
Alumni of Manchester Metropolitan University
Artists from Cardiff
English industrial designers
Industrial design
Designers
Furniture designers
British industrial designers
British furniture designers
Alumni of the Royal College of Art